Fais-moi mal, Johnny (in English: Hurt me, Johnny) is a French song written by Boris Vian, composed by Alain Goraguer in 1955, and performed for the first time by Magali Noël in 1956. It's considered one of the first French rock-n-roll songs. 

The song tells the story of a girl who approaches a man for violent sex. The man does not understand the nature of envy; also the woman insults him so that he hits her, stinging him to the quick but then he hits her too hard and hurts her. The comedy also comes from this incomprehension. 

Fais-moi mal, Johnny was then prohibited from being broadcast on the radio5 and criticized by the Catholic church.

References 

French music
French rock songs